Wyrzyki  is a village in the administrative district of Gmina Piątnica, within Łomża County, Podlaskie Voivodeship, in north-eastern Poland.

The village has a population of 102.

References

Wyrzyki